Dick Barton Strikes Back is a 1949 British spy film about special agent Dick Barton. It was the third of three films that Hammer Film Productions made about the agent, although it was the second released.

Plot
Captain Richard 'Dick' Barton and his associate Snowey White, uncover a spyring of international psychopathic criminals with plans to dominate Great Britain, if not, the world, using a terrifying weapon of mass destruction.

Title
The film's title during production was Dick Barton and the Silent Plague.

Cast
 Don Stannard as Dick Barton
 Bruce Walker as Snowey White
 Sebastian Cabot as Fouracada
 James Raglan as Lord Armadale
 Jean Lodge as Tina
 Morris Sweden as Robert Creston
 John Harvey as Major Henderson
 Humphrey Kent as Colonel Gardener
 Sidney Vivian as Inspector Burke
 Tony Morelli as Nicholas
 George Crawford as Alex
 Larry Taylor as Nick (as Laurie Taylor)

Critical reception
Mystery File wrote: "This is a little kid's idea of a Spy Movie, with transparent trickery, obvious "surprise" villains and character development just below the level of a CLUE game, but it was clearly also the precursor of the James Bond films, with the suave, hard-fighting hero flung in and out of the clutches of sinister villains and predatory females with equal aplomb. It's a time-waster, sure, but a fun thing, with death rays, a sinister carnival and a really gripping final set-to up and down a (rather unsettlingly phallic) tower". The Spinning Image found "an excellent example of pure pulp cinema, Dick Barton Strikes Back is solidly entertaining and never flags, right up to the finish line". TV Guide called it "the best of the three "Dick Barton" films".

References

External links
 

1949 films
1940s spy films
British spy films
Films directed by Godfrey Grayson
Films based on radio series
British sequel films
Hammer Film Productions films
British black-and-white films
1940s British films